Abdolabad (also Romanized as ‘Abdolābād and ‘Abdūlābād) is a village in Damankuh Rural District, in the Central District of Damghan County, Semnan Province, Iran. At the 2006 census, its population was 22, in 5 families.

References 

Populated places in Damghan County